Jacob Poroo (December 1, 1938 - June 18, 1968) was a medic for the United States Coast Guard who died of burns suffered when fire struck the remote Alaskan base he was assigned to.

On 2 June 1968, the recreation hall of the Loran station at Adak, Alaska, started to burn. After Poroo and other men escaped from the burning building, he re-entered it when he thought he heard cries for help.  After he had been terribly burned, a head count determined that no one was missing. A Coast Guard account of the event records that, even though he was horribly burned himself, Poroo guided uninjured men in how to properly care for those who had been burned.

Poroo died on June 18, 1968.

Legacy

A posthumous Coast Guard Medal was awarded to Poroo.

In 2010, Charles "Skip" W. Bowen, who was then the Coast Guard's most senior non-commissioned officer, proposed that all 58 cutters in the Sentinel class should be named after enlisted sailors in the Coast Guard, or one of its precursor services, who were recognized for their heroism. In 2015 the Coast Guard announced that Jacob Poroo would be the namesake of the 25th cutter, USCGC Jacob L. A. Poroo.  She was built in Lockport, Louisiana, at the Bollinger shipyards, and delivered to the Coast Guard on September 5, 2017.  After completing her sea trials, the cutter was commissioned in December 2017.

References

1938 births
1968 deaths
United States Coast Guard non-commissioned officers
Recipients of the Coast Guard Medal
Deaths from fire in the United States